Wali-e-Mewat Raja Khanzada  Ahmad Khan Mewati, Bahadur, son of Khanzada Jalal Khan Mewati,  was the Khanzada Rajput ruler of Mewat from 1443 till 1468. He was succeeded by his son Khanzada Zakaria Khan Mewati as Wali-e-Mewat in 1468.

References

 

Mewat
Indian Muslims
Year of birth unknown